Conus straturatus is a species of sea snail, a marine gastropod mollusk in the family Conidae, the cone snails, cone shells or cones.

These snails are predatory and venomous. They are capable of "stinging" humans.

Description
The size of the shell varies between 29 mm and 39 mm. The shell shows interrupted longitudinal chestnut markings forming bands upon an ash-blue ground. The moderate spire is smooth. 
The body whorl is encircled below by distant grooves.

Distribution
This marine species occurs in the southwest Pacific Ocean.

References

 Sowerby, G. B., II. 1865. Descriptions of two new species of Conus from the collection of H. Cuming, ESQ., and two from the collection of the late Mr. Denisson. Proceedings of the Zoological Society of London 1865:518-519, pl. 32
 Filmer R.M. (2012) Taxonomic review of the Conus spectrum, Conus stramineus and Conus collisus complexes (Gastropoda - Conidae). Part III: The Conus collisus complex. Visaya 3(6): 4-47
 Puillandre N., Duda T.F., Meyer C., Olivera B.M. & Bouchet P. (2015). One, four or 100 genera? A new classification of the cone snails. Journal of Molluscan Studies. 81: 1-23

External links
 To World Register of Marine Species
 Cone Shells - Knights of the Sea
 

straturatus
Gastropods described in 1865